Eugene "Gene" H. Tapia (March 16, 1925 – April 12, 2005) was an American race car driver from Mobile, Alabama. He competed in four NASCAR Grand National Series races, but he is best known for racing in the #327 supermodified. He was nicknamed the "King of the Supermodifieds."

Early life
Tapia was born on March 16, 1925, in Mobile, Alabama, to Ada and Homer Tapia. When he was nine years old, he attended a dirt track race with his father. His father began taking him regularly to motorcycle races in the mid 1930s.

At the age of 17, Tapia got married. That same year, he was involved in a street fight and the county district attorney suggested that he should leave town to avoid prosecution. In order to resolve the matter amicably, he left Mobile to work as a civilian on a military base in Alaska. Tapia was wounded when the Japanese attacked Dutch Harbor in June 1942.

While Tapia was away, his wife gave birth to a boy named Larry Eugene Tapia in September 1942 at Memphis, Tennessee. Before either parent was able to see the baby, he was stolen by Georgia Tann's baby theft ring that worked at the hospital.

In June 1943, Tapia returned to Mobile where he enlisted in the United States Marine Corps. He served with the Third Marine Division in Guadalcanal, the first-day invasion of Guam, and spent over 35 days on Iwo Jima.

Racing career
In 1948, Tapia began racing as a way to get past battle stress which plagued him after the War. Later that year, he won his first stock car race at Chisholm Fairgrounds in Montgomery, Alabama. He raced in several NASCAR races that season. During his brief time spent racing in NASCAR, he won the Florida state title and the 1953 Mississippi state title. He left the circuit because he wanted to race five nights per week instead of one night. "Tapia was right up there with the best," said Donnie Allison. "He could have made it real good in NASCAR, if he had chosen. But I think his regard for his family and the desire to race more frequently is what kept him closer to home."

Tapia won the 1968 and 1969 World 300 Supermodified race at Mobile International Speedway. The event was billed as the "world's richest supermodified race".

Later life
In 1990, Tapia was able to meet his son. The 47-year-old, who was living in Missouri, was told that his parents had died in an automobile accident. Tapia died in 2005 at the age of 80.

Awards
He was inducted in the Alabama Auto Racing Pioneers Hall of Fame in 1999.

Motorsports career results

NASCAR
(key) (Bold – Pole position awarded by qualifying time. Italics – Pole position earned by points standings or practice time. * – Most laps led.)

Grand National Series

Biography
The Gene Tapia Story: King of the Supermodifieds

References

External links
 
 Articles

Sportspeople from Mobile, Alabama
NASCAR drivers
2005 deaths
1925 births
Racing drivers from Alabama
United States Marine Corps personnel of World War II